The Walton sextuplets were born at Liverpool Maternity Hospital in Liverpool, England on 18 November 1983 and were the world's first all-female surviving sextuplets, and the world's fourth known set of surviving sextuplets. The children are Hannah, Luci, Ruth, Sarah, Kate, and Jennifer.

The children were born to Janet (née Leadbetter) and Graham Walton and grew up in the family's seven-bedroom home in Wallasey, Merseyside. On 13 June 2011 the sextuplets were featured in the ITV1 program Moving On.

In February 2015, Janet Walton's book Six Little Miracles: The Heartwarming True Story of Raising the World’s First Sextuplet Girls was published by Ebury Press.

Children 
All six children were delivered by Caesarean section at Liverpool Maternity Hospital, Liverpool at 31 and a half weeks gestation. In order of birth the sextuplets are:
Hannah Jane 
Luci Anne
Ruth Michelle
Sarah Louise
Kate Elizabeth
Jennifer Rose

See also 
 List of multiple births

References 

1983 births
Sextuplets
People from Wallasey
Living people